The list of ship launches in 1934 includes a chronological list of some ships launched in 1934.

References 

Sources

1934
Ship launches